Sir William Dugdale (12 September 1605 – 10 February 1686) was an English antiquary and herald. As a scholar he was influential in the development of medieval history as an academic subject.

Life

Dugdale was born at Shustoke, near Coleshill in Warwickshire, where his father, John Dugdale, was steward to the local landowner. As he was born, a swarm of bees flew into the garden, which some considered "a happy presage on the life of the babe".

He was educated at King Henry VIII School, Coventry. In 1623, he married Margaret Huntbach (1607–81), with whom he had nineteen children. In 1625, the year after his father's death, he purchased the manor of Blyth, near Shustoke. During an enclosure dispute with a neighbour a few years later he met the Leicestershire antiquary William Burton, who acted as arbitrator. He became involved in transcribing documents and collecting church notes and met other Midlands antiquaries such as Sir Simon Archer (1581–1662) and Sir Thomas Habington. He began working with Archer on the history of Warwickshire and their research led them to the archives of public records in London. There he met Sir Christopher Hatton, Sir Henry Spelman, Sir Simonds d'Ewes and Sir Edward Dering. Hatton provided him with hospitality in Holborn and became his principal patron.

In 1638, through the influence of his friends Dugdale was created a pursuivant of arms extraordinary by the name of Blanche Lyon, and, in 1639, he was promoted to the office of Rouge Croix Pursuivant of Arms in Ordinary. The accommodation in the College of Arms and the income from his post enabled him to pursue his research in London. 

According to his later account, in 1641 Sir Christopher Hatton, foreseeing the English Civil War and dreading the ruin and spoliation of the Church, commissioned him to make exact drafts of all the monuments in Westminster Abbey and the principal churches in England.

In June 1642, he was summoned with the other heralds to attend the king at York. When the war broke out Charles deputed him to summon the castles of Banbury and Warwick to surrender. 

He witnessed the Battle of Edgehill, and later returned with a surveyor to make a survey of the battlefield. He arrived in Oxford with the king in November 1642 and he was admitted MA of the University. He worked as a bureaucrat in the royalist capital, especially after December 1643 when Hatton was appointed Comptroller of the Household. In 1644 the king appointed him Chester Herald of Arms in Ordinary.

During his leisure at Oxford he collected material at the Bodleian Library and college libraries for his books. It was during these years that he met Elias Ashmole, who later became his son-in-law. Following the surrender of Oxford in 1646 Dugdale returned to Blyth Hall and compounded for his estates under the terms of the Oxford articles. Hatton, who had opposed the surrender, went into exile in France, where Dugdale visited him in 1648. 

He recommenced his antiquarian researches, collaborating with Roger Dodsworth on the Monasticon Anglicanum, the first volume of which was published in 1655. In the following year he published his own Antiquities of Warwickshire, which was soon recognised as a model county history. In this work he was one of the first to consider the significance of stone tools, stating these were "weapons used by the Britons before the art of making arms of brass or iron was known".

At the Restoration Dugdale obtained the office of Norroy King of Arms through the influence of the Earl of Clarendon. In the office of Norroy he undertook heraldic visitations of the counties north of the Trent. 

In 1677 he was knighted and promoted to the office of Garter Principal King of Arms, which he held until his death. In his last years he wrote an account of his life at the request of Anthony Wood. He died "in his chair" at Blyth Hall in 1686, aged 80.

Works
Monasticon Anglicanum (1655–1673); As can be read on the title page, the original was written in Latin and the work linked to here is the version translated into English and abridged by James Wright. This version was published in 1693.
Antiquities of Warwickshire (1656)
History of St Paul's Cathedral (1658) 
The History of Imbanking and Drayning (1662)
Origines Juridiciales (1666)
Baronage of England (1675–1676) 
A Short View of the Late Troubles (1681)
Ancient Usage of Bearing Arms (1682)
Visitations of Derbyshire, Yorkshire, etc.

He also edited Sir Henry Spelman's Glossarium Archaiologicum (1664) and Concilia (1664), adding his own extensions to the latter. His Life'', written by himself up to 1678, with his diary and correspondence, and an index to his manuscript collections, was edited by William Hamper, and published in 1827.

Arms

Legacy
The Dugdale Society, a text publication society for Warwickshire, takes its name from William Dugdale.

See also 
 College of Arms
 Dugdale baronets

References

Sources

External links

Catalogue of Dugdale's correspondence
Dugdale Society

1605 births
1686 deaths
People educated at King Henry VIII School, Coventry
English officers of arms
English antiquarians
English genealogists
English knights
17th-century antiquarians
17th-century English historians
17th-century English male writers
17th-century English writers
Knights Bachelor
Garter Principal Kings of Arms
17th-century diarists
17th-century Latin-language writers